Radelj may refer to:

 Prelaz Radelj or Radl Pass, a mountain pass in the Alps
 Jure Radelj (born 1977), Slovenian ski jumper
 Radelj (Croatia), an island of Croatia

See also
 Radel (disambiguation)